Capomycin is an antitumor antibiotic with the molecular formula C35H38O10 which is produced by the bacterium Streptomyces capoamus.

References 

Antibiotics
Polyols
Esters
Dienes